Tabăra may refer to several villages in Romania:

 Tabăra, a village in Bivolari Commune, Iași County
 Tabăra, a village in Icușești Commune, Neamț County

and a village in Moldova:
 Tabăra, a village in Vatici Commune, Orhei District